Saint-Télesphore is a municipality located in Vaudreuil-Soulanges Regional County Municipality, Quebec (Canada). The population as of the 2021 Canadian census was 754. The municipality is situated west of Saint-Polycarpe, south of Sainte-Justine-de-Newton, north of Rivière-Baudette and east of the provincial border near North Lancaster, Ontario.

The municipality is named for Pope Telesphorus, who reigned from 126 to 138 AD. In addition to the village of Saint-Télesphore itself, the municipality also includes the community of Dalhousie or Dalhousie Station along the Canadian Pacific railway.

History
Settlement began around 1800 with the arrival of Scottish, Irish, and English immigrants. At that time, the place was called Rivière-Delisle, Lac-Saint-François, or Rivière-au-Beaudet.

In 1877, the Parish Municipality of Saint-Télesphore was created, named after the parish that was formed one year earlier. In 1879, its post office opened.

On August 7, 2010, the parish municipality changed its statutes to become a (regular) municipality.

Demographics

Language

Local government

List of former mayors:

 Camille Gourgon (1878–1883)
 Jean Baptiste Campeau (1883–1884, 1885–1886)
 Athanase Daou (1884–1885, 1886–1889)
 Joseph Pilon (1889–1893, 1897–1899, 1902–1905)
 Louis Charlebois (1893–1897)
 Joseph Antoine Moyse Leroux (1899–1902, 1917-1919)
 Joseph Moyse Beauchamp (1905–1909)
 François Xavier Cuillierier (1909–1913)
 Louis Sauvé (1913–1914)
 Zotique Dicaire (1914–1917)
 Joseph Alfred Théodule Pilon (1919–1923)
 Joseph Arthur Hyacinthe St. Denis (1923–1927)
 Joseph Alfred Louis Charlebois (1927–1939)
 Joseph Samuel Evariste Braseau (1939–1953)
 Joseph Arcade Napoléon Bruno St-Denis (1953–1959)
 Joseph-Elzéar-Rosario-Richard Gaston Pilon (1959–1963)
 Joseph Jean-Baptiste Rémi Sauvé (1963–1981, 1987–1999)
 Joseph Marcel Eléonore Descent (1981–1983)
 Robert Bourgon (1983–1987, 1999–2003)
 Joseph Albert Patrice Claude Cyr (2003–2009)
 Yvon Bériault (2009–2021)
 David Watson McKay (2021–present)

Education
Commission Scolaire des Trois-Lacs operates Francophone schools.
 École du Val-des-Prés Immaculée-Conception

Lester B. Pearson School Board operates Anglophone schools.
 Soulanges Elementary School in Saint-Télesphore or Evergreen Elementary and Forest Hill Elementary (Junior Campus and Senior campus) in Saint-Lazare

See also
 List of municipalities in Quebec

References

External links

Municipalities in Quebec
Incorporated places in Vaudreuil-Soulanges Regional County Municipality